Joe Jackson (born December 20, 1996) is an American football defensive end for the Birmingham Stallions of the United States Football League (USFL). He played college football at Miami (FL).

Early years
Jackson attended Gulliver Prep, where he was a two-way starter at defensive end and tight end. As a junior, he totaled 59 tackles and 4 sacks. As a senior, he tallied 46 tackles, 6 sacks and 4 forced fumbles. He was named the 2015 Class 5A-1A Male Athlete of the Year by the Miami Herald.

He finished his high school career with 178 tackles, 19 sacks and 8 forced fumbles. He also practiced basketball and track.

College career
Jackson was a 4-star recruit and accepted a football scholarship from the University of Miami over Clemson, Alabama and Florida State on May 26, 2016. 

As a true freshman, he played in all 13 games (2 starts), finishing with 32 total tackles, 11.5 for loss (led the team), 8.5 sacks (led the team), 2 forced fumbles and 2 fumble recoveries, including a touchdown.

As a sophomore, he appeared in 13 games with 12 starts at right defensive end, registering 59 tackles (11.5 tackles for loss), 6.5 sacks, 2 pass breakups and one forced fumble. He had 8 tackles (1.5 for loss) against the University of North Carolina.

As a junior, he started 12 out of 13 games at right defensive end, posting 47 tackles, 14.5 tackles for loss (third on the team), 9 sacks (led the team), 9 quarterback hurries (led the team), 2 pass breakups and one interception returned for a touchdown. He had 4 tackles, 2 sacks and 2.5 tackles for loss against Florida State University.

On January 3, 2019, he announced that he would forgo his final year of eligibility and declare for the 2019 NFL Draft.

College statistics

Professional career

Dallas Cowboys
Jackson was selected by the Dallas Cowboys in the fifth round (165th overall) of the 2019 NFL Draft. As a rookie, he appeared in 5 games as a backup defensive end and was declared inactive in 11 contests (including the last 9). His participation decreased after Robert Quinn was reinstated from suspension on September 16. He played only 72 defensive snaps, most of them (26) coming in the season opener against the New York Giants. He totaled 5 tackles, 2 quarterback pressures and one pass defensed.

In 2020, the team brought in new talent at the defensive end position (Aldon Smith, Everson Griffen, Bradlee Anae, Randy Gregory) and he was waived on September 4.

Cleveland Browns
On September 6, 2020, he was claimed off waivers by the Cleveland Browns. He was active but did not play in the fifth game against the Indianapolis Colts. On November 24, he was placed on the reserve/COVID-19 list and was later activated on December 4, after being quarantined for being in close contact with an infected person. He appeared in 3 games as a reserve player and was declared inactive in 11 contests, while making 5 tackles.

Jackson was waived by the Browns on August 31, 2021. The Browns re-signed Jackson to their active roster on September 1, 2021. He was waived on October 8, 2021, and re-signed to the Browns' practice squad, along with being elevated to the active roster for the Browns' October 10, 2021 game, on October 9, 2021. Jackson reverted to the Browns' practice squad on October 11, 2021. Jackson was re-signed to the Browns' active roster on October 12, 2021. He was waived on November 27 and re-signed to the practice squad. Jackson was elevated to the Browns' active roster as a COVID-19 replacement player on December 24, 2021.

Kansas City Chiefs
On January 20, 2022, Jackson was signed to the Kansas City Chiefs practice squad.

Carolina Panthers
On February 17, 2022, Jackson signed a reserve/future contract with the Carolina Panthers. He was waived on May 24.

Birmingham Stallions
On March 14, 2023, Jackson signed with the Birmingham Stallions of the United States Football League (USFL).

Career statistics

References

External links
 Miami Hurricanes bio

1996 births
Living people
Gulliver Preparatory School alumni
Players of American football from Miami
American football defensive ends
Miami Hurricanes football players
Dallas Cowboys players
Cleveland Browns players
Kansas City Chiefs players
Carolina Panthers players
Birmingham Stallions (2022) players